Meza is a genus of skippers in the family Hesperiidae.

Species
Meza banda (Evans, 1937)
Meza cybeutes (Holland, 1894)
Meza elba (Evans, 1937)
Meza gardineri Collins & Larsen, 2008
Meza indusiata (Mabille, 1891)
Meza larea (Neave, 1910)
Meza leucophaea (Holland, 1894)
Meza mabea (Holland, 1894)
Meza mabillei (Holland, 1894)
Meza meza (Hewitson, 1877)

References

Seitz, A. Die Gross-Schmetterlinge der Erde 13: Die Afrikanischen Tagfalter. Plate XIII 77

Erionotini
Hesperiidae genera